Bande Nere is a station on Line 1 of the Milan Metro in Milan, Italy. The station is underground and is located at Piazza Giovanni dalle Bande Nere.

History 
The station was opened on 18 April 1975 as part of the section between Gambara and Inganni. Bande Nere is part of the trunk Pagano-Bisceglie.

References

Line 1 (Milan Metro) stations
Railway stations opened in 1975
1975 establishments in Italy
Railway stations in Italy opened in the 20th century